Phtheochroa imitana is a species of moth of the family Tortricidae. It is found in eastern Turkey.

References

Moths described in 1992
Phtheochroa